The Wilson Glacier is a medium-sized tributary glacier located on the southeast flank of Mount Rainier in Washington. The glacier is directly feeds ice to the adjacent, but much larger Nisqually Glacier. Meltwater from the glacier feeds the Nisqually River.

See also
List of glaciers

References

Glaciers of Mount Rainier
Glaciers of Washington (state)